The 1929 Victorian state election was held in the Australian state of Victoria on Saturday 30 November 1929 to elect the 65 members of the state's Legislative Assembly.

Background

Seat changes
The Nationalist Party had gained two seats in the Assembly since the previous election, having won two by-elections in seats held by independents. Henry Bodman (Gippsland South) died on 2 November 1927, and Walter West won the seat for the Nationalists on 3 December. Speaker Oswald Snowball (Brighton), who had been disendorsed by the Nationalists in the previous election after voting against the redistribution bill, had rejoined the Nationalists since but died on 16 March 1928. Ian Macfarlan won the seat in the by-election on 24 April 1928.

Results

Legislative Assembly

|}
Notes:
Twenty seats were uncontested at this election, and were retained by the incumbent parties:
Labor (14): Bendigo, Brunswick, Carlton, Clifton Hill, Coburg, Collingwood, Flemington, Footscray, Maryborough and Daylesford, Melbourne, Northcote, Richmond, Williamstown, Wonthaggi
Nationalist (3): Allandale, Benambra, Upper Yarra
Country (1): Goulburn Valley
Country Progressive (1): Ouyen

See also
Candidates of the 1929 Victorian state election
1928 Victorian Legislative Council election
Members of the Victorian Legislative Assembly, 1929–1932

References

1929 elections in Australia
Elections in Victoria (Australia)
1920s in Victoria (Australia)
November 1929 events